Anti-centromere antibodies (ACAs; often styled solid, anticentromere) are autoantibodies specific to centromere and kinetochore function. They occur in some autoimmune diseases, frequently in limited systemic scleroderma (formerly called CREST syndrome), and occasionally in the diffuse form of scleroderma.  They are rare in other rheumatic conditions and in healthy persons. 

Anti-centromere antibodies are found in approximately 60% of patients with limited systemic scleroderma and in 15% of those with the diffuse form of scleroderma. The specificity of this test is >98%. Thus, a positive anti-centromere antibody finding is strongly suggestive of limited systemic scleroderma. Anti-centromere antibodies present early in the course of disease and are notably predictive of limited cutaneous involvement and a decreased likelihood of aggressive internal organ involvement, such as fibrosis in the lungs.

When present in primary biliary cirrhosis, ACAs are prognostic of portal hypertension such that serum ACA levels correlate with the severity of portal hypertension.

References

C